RhodeSongs (1993) is the seventh album by American singer-songwriter Happy Rhodes.

Overview

A collection of quieter songs from Rhodes' first 6 albums, with an emphasis on the first 4. It also included acoustic versions of earlier songs and a cover of David Bowie's "Ashes To Ashes," as well as the Acoustic Tribute Version of the song "Feed The Fire," a song originally written to pay homage to musicians Rhodes admired. The special version included snippets of songs by Kate Bush, Yes and David Bowie.

Track listing
All music, lyrics, voices, instruments and arrangements – Happy Rhodes (except as noted in credits)

 "Feed The Fire" (album version, from Warpaint) – 4:35
 "The Wretches Gone Awry" (album version, from Rhodes I) – 2:36
 "Ode" (album version, from Ecto) – 4:13
 "I Say" (album version, from Equipoise) – 5:41
 "Save Our Souls" (acoustic version) – 5:31
 "The Revelation" (album version, from Rhodes II) – 3:04
 "Because I Learn" (album version, from Rearmament) – 3:43
 "If So" (album version, from Ecto) – 3:40
 "Given In" (for "World Cafe", 1991) – 4:11
 "In Hiding" (acoustic version) – 3:31
 "I Have A Heart" (album version, from Rearmament) – 4:44
 "Ashes to Ashes" (acoustic David Bowie cover) – 3:46
 "Let Me Know, Love" (album version, from Rhodes II) – 3:26
 "Temporary and Eternal" (album version, from Equipoise) – 4:49
 "Summer" (previously unreleased) – 3:06
 "Feed The Fire" (acoustic Tribute version) – 4:02
 "Buggy Track" – 0:08

1993 tape US Aural Gratification AGC 0021 17 tracks, 64:49 minutes
1993 CD US Aural Gratification AGCD0021 17 tracks, 64:49 minutes

Produced by Happy Rhodes and Kevin Bartlett 
Engineered by Pat Tessitore at Cathedral Sound Studios, Rensselaer, NY

Personnel
Happy Rhodes: 
Vocals, Guitar, Keyboards
Kevin Bartlett: 
Electric Guitar, Bass Guitar, Keyboards
Chuck D'Aloia: 
Nylon String Guitar
Ray Jung: 
Bass

"Ashes To Ashes" – by David Bowie – Tintoretto Music, Fleur Music, Administered by Screen Gems / EMI

"Feed The Fire" (Acoustic Tribute Version) features lines from:
"Long Distance Runaround" – Jon Anderson, Topographic Music, Ltd., Administered by WB Music
"Running Up That Hill" – Kate Bush, Kate Bush Music Ltd.,
"Starman" – David Bowie, Tintoretto Music, Fleur Music, Moth Music, Administered by Chrysalis Music, Screen Gems / EMI

Happy Rhodes albums
1993 compilation albums